Crocanthes fallax is a moth in the family Lecithoceridae. It was described by John Hartley Durrant in 1915. It is found on New Guinea.

The forewings are shining, purplish fuscous, with a narrow, outwardly oblique, pale primrose-yellow fascia crossing the wing from the middle of the costa almost to the dorsum, and with a minute dull ochreous, triangular, costal spot before the apex. The hindwings are purplish fuscous.

References

Moths described in 1915
Crocanthes